Cerić is a surname. Notable people with the surname include:

Mustafa Cerić (born 1952), Bosnian cleric
Tarik Cerić (born 1978), Bosnian footballer 
Larisa Cerić (born 1991), Bosnian judoka
Semir Cerić (born 1963), Bosnian singer

See also
Cerić, settlement
Cerići, settlement

Bosnian surnames